This is a list of Representatives elected to the House of Representatives for the Forty-Fourth session of the House of Representatives of the National Diet of Japan at the 2005 general election, held on 11 September 2005.

Composition

The Government

Liberal Democratic Party (293 members)
Shinzō Abe
Toshiko Abe
Kazuo Aichi
Ichiro Aisawa
Norihiko Akagi
Masaaki Akaike
Jiro Akama
Ryosei Akazawa
Kenya Akiba
Akira Amari
Etsuji Arai
Osamu Ashitomi
Tarō Asō
Kōki Chūma
Masaki Doi
Tōru Doi
Nobuhiko Endō
Takehiko Endo
Toshiaki Endo
Tetsuma Esaki
Yoichiro Esaki
Akinori Eto
Seishiro Etō
Yuji Fujii
Makiko Fujino
Mikio Fujita
Takashi Fukaya
Mineyuki Fukuda
Yasuo Fukuda
Yoshihiko Fukuda
Teru Fukui
Takamaro Fukuoka
Hajime Funada
Koji Futada
Shigeyuki Goto
Masazumi Gotoda
Koichi Hagiuda
Seiji Hagiwara
Kyogon Hagiyama
Yasukazu Hamada
Yasuhiro Hanashi
Yoshiaki Harada
Yoshitsugu Harada
Hiroshi Hase
Gaku Hashimoto
Kunio Hatoyama
Chuko Hayakawa
Jun Hayashi
Motoo Hayashi
Takeshi Hayashida
Hiroshi Hiraguchi
Takuya Hirai
Katsuei Hirasawa
Koichi Hirata
Motoko Hirotsu
Hiroyuki Hosoda
Bummei Ibuki
Yukari Iijima
Hiroshi Imai
Hiroshi Imazu
Yamato Inaba
Tomomi Inada
Kuniko Inoguchi
Kiichi Inoue
Shinji Inoue
Shigeru Ishiba
Masatoshi Ishida
Hirotaka Ishihara
Nobuteru Ishihara
Gaku Ishizaki
Kosuke Ito
Shintaro Ito
Tadahiko Ito
Tatsuya Ito
Nobuko Iwaki
Mineichi Iwanaga
Takeshi Iwaya
Kyoko Izawa
Yukio Jitsukawa
Chube Kagita
Toshiki Kaifu
Hiroshi Kajiyama
Chiken Kakazu
Yoshitami Kameoka
Yoko Kamikawa
Ichiro Kamoshita
Kazuyoshi Kaneko
Yasushi Kaneko
Zenjiro Kaneko
Satsuki Katayama
Katsunobu Kato
Koichi Kato
Katsuyuki Kawai
Shika Kawajo
Takeo Kawamura
Riki Kawara
Jiro Kawasaki
Minoru Kihara
Seiji Kihara
Ben Kimura
Takahide Kimura
Tarō Kimura
Yoshio Kimura
Fumio Kishida
Tomokatsu Kitagawa
Seigo Kitamura
Shigeo Kitamura
Tsukasa Kobiki
Makoto Koga
Yuriko Koike
Junichiro Koizumi
Toshio Kojima
Saburo Komoto
Masahiko Komura
Mitsue Kondo
Motohiko Kondo
Taro Kono
Kenji Kosaka
Takashi Kosugi
Masatoshi Kurata
Fumio Kyuma
Nobutaka Machimura
Hideki Makihara
Yoshitake Masuhara
Fumiaki Matsumoto
Jun Matsumoto
Yohei Matsumoto
Kenshiro Matsunami
Kenta Matsunami
Hirokazu Matsuno
Toshikatsu Matsuoka
Midori Matsushima
Tatsuharu Mawatari
Asahiko Mihara
Nobuhide Minorikawa
Takashi Mitsubayashi
Norio Mitsuya
Kazuaki Miyaji
Mitsuhiro Miyakoshi
Ichiro Miyashita
Yoichi Miyazawa
Kenichi Mizuno
Yoshio Mochizuki
Eisuke Mori
Yoshiro Mori
Masahito Moriyama
Mayumi Moriyama
Toshimitsu Motegi
Seiichiro Murakami
Yoshitaka Murata
Yoji Muto
Keiko Nagaoka
Kotaro Nagasaki
Jinen Nagase
Tadayoshi Nagashima
Hidenao Nakagawa
Shoichi Nakagawa
Yasuhiro Nakagawa
Fukuyo Nakamori
Seiji Nakamura
Kazuyuki Nakane
Kiyoshi Nakano
Masashi Nakano
Gen Nakatani
Nariaki Nakayama
Taro Nakayama
Yasuhide Nakayama
Masayoshi Namiki
Takumi Nemoto
Toshihiro Nikai
Takeshi Nishida
Koya Nishikawa
Kyoko Nishikawa
Kosaburo Nishime
Katsuko Nishimoto
Akihiro Nishimura
Yasutoshi Nishimura
Akira Nishino
Hideki Niwa
Yuya Niwa
Takeshi Noda
Fukushiro Nukaga
Yuko Obuchi
Takao Ochi
Yuichi Ogawa
Matsushige Ohno
Yoshinori Ohno
Hideaki Okabe
Yoshiro Okamoto
Nobuko Okashita
Hachiro Okonogi
Shinsuke Okuno
Shigeo Omae
Koji Omi
Nobuhiro Omiya
Hideaki Omura
Jiro Ono
Shinya Ono
Itsunori Onodera
Tadamori Oshima
Seiichi Ota
Takashi Otsuka
Taku Otsuka
Yasuhiro Ozato
Toshitsugu Saito
Manabu Sakai
Goji Sakamoto
Yoshitaka Sakurada
Ikuzo Sakurai
Takashi Sasagawa
Genichiro Sata
Ren Sato
Tatsuo Sato (politician)
Tsutomu Sato
Yukari Sato
Yoshihiro Seki
Masahiko Shibayama
Akira Shichijo
Yoshinobu Shimamura
Koichiro Shimizu
Seiichiro Shimizu
Hakubun Shimomura
Yoshitaka Shindo
Yosuke Shinoda
Ryu Shionoya
Yasuhisa Shiozaki
Hiroyuki Sonoda
Kentaro Sonoura
Yoshihide Suga
Isshu Sugawara
Taizō Sugimura
Motoshi Sugita
Seiken Sugiura
Junji Suzuki
Keisuke Suzuki
Shunichi Suzuki
Tsuneo Suzuki
Masaaki Taira
Tsuyoshi Takagi
Sanae Takaichi
Shuichi Takatori
Tsutomu Takebe
Naokazu Takemoto
Wataru Takeshita
Tokuichiro Tamazawa
Norihisa Tamura
Yasufumi Tanahashi
Kazunori Tanaka
Ryosei Tanaka
Koichi Tani
Sadakazu Tanigaki
Yaichi Tanigawa
Takashi Tanihata
Tatsuya Tanimoto
Ryotaro Tanose
Minoru Terada
Toru Toida
Kisaburo Tokai
Naomi Tokashiki
Tsutomu Tomioka
Masatada Tsuchiya
Shinako Tsuchiya
Yuji Tsushima
Kenichiro Ueno
Toshio Ukishima
Osamu Uno
Hideo Usui
Kenji Wakamiya
Atsushi Watanabe
Hiromichi Watanabe
Tomoyoshi Watanabe
Yoshimi Watanabe
Daishiro Yamagiwa
Taimei Yamaguchi
Akihiko Yamamoto
Koichi Yamamoto
Kozo Yamamoto
Taku Yamamoto
Tomohiro Yamamoto
Yuji Yamamoto
Akiko Yamanaka
Taku Yamasaki
Koichi Yamauchi
Takuji Yanagimoto
Hakuo Yanagisawa
Takashi Yano
Junichiro Yasui
Okiharu Yasuoka
Yoshio Yatsu
Kaoru Yosano
Rokuzaemon Yoshida
Takamori Yoshikawa
Masayoshi Yoshino

New Komeito (20 members)

Kazuyoshi Akaba
Masao Akamatsu
Yasuyuki Eda
Otohiko Endo
Yutaka Fukushima
Noriko Furuya
Tetsuzo Fuyushiba
Junji Higashi
Yasuko Ikenobo
Yoshihisa Inoue
Noritoshi Ishida
Keiichi Ishii
Wataru Ito
Takenori Kanzaki
Kazuo Kitagawa
Kaori Maruya
Keigo Masuya
Hiroyoshi Nishi
Yoshinori Oguchi
Akihiro Ota
Tetsuo Saito
Chikara Sakaguchi
Shigeki Sato
Masahiro Tabata
Michiyo Takagi
Yosuke Takagi
Kazufumi Taniguchi
Takayoshi Taniguchi
Shigeyuki Tomita
Isamu Ueda
Yoshio Urushibara

The Opposition

Democratic Party (113 members)
Hirotaka Akamatsu
Satoshi Arai
Jun Azumi
Yutaka Banno
Ryuichi Doi
Yukio Edano
Osamu Fujimura
Akio Fukuda
Motohisa Furukawa
Shinichiro Furumoto
Kōichirō Genba
Hitoshi Goto
Yoshio Hachiro
Kazuhiro Haraguchi
Tsutomu Hata
Yukio Hatoyama
Hirofumi Hirano
Hideo Hiraoka
Ritsuo Hosokawa
Goshi Hosono
Koichiro Ichimura
Motohisa Ikeda
Takashi Ishizeki
Tetsundo Iwakuni
Kenta Izumi
Hideo Jimpu
Naoto Kan
Seiichi Kaneta
Koichi Kato
Tatsuo Kawabata
Takashi Kawamura
Hiroshi Kawauchi
Toru Kikawada
Makiko Kikuta
Shuji Kira
Keiro Kitagami
Kenji Kitahashi
Tadamasa Kodaira
Issei Koga
Yasuko Komiyama
Yoko Komiyama
Shoichi Kondo
Yosuke Kondo
Kazuko Kori
Sumio Mabuchi
Yukichi Maeda
Seiji Maehara
Yoshio Maki
Jin Matsubara
Kenko Matsuki
Daisuke Matsumoto
Ryu Matsumoto
Takeaki Matsumoto
Yorihisa Matsuno
Taizo Mikazuki
Mitsuo Mitani
Wakio Mitsui
Tetsuo Morimoto
Muneaki Murai
Hiroyuki Nagahama
Akihisa Nagashima
Akira Nagatsuma
Takashi Nagayasu
Masaharu Nakagawa
Hiroshi Nakai
Hiroko Nakano
Chinami Nishimura
Yoshihiko Noda
Junya Ogawa
Hiroshi Ogushi
Akihiro Ohata
Katsuya Okada
Mitsunori Okamoto
Tenzo Okumura
Seiji Osaka
Atsushi Oshima
Kazumi Ota
Ichirō Ozawa
Sakihito Ozawa
Hirofumi Ryu
Ryuzo Sasaki
Takahiro Sasaki
Yoshito Sengoku
Mitsu Shimojo
Takashi Shinohara
Yasuhiro Sonoda
Yoshinori Suematsu
Katsumasa Suzuki
Issei Tajima
Kaname Tajima
Miho Takai
Yoshiaki Takaki
Satoshi Takayama
Koichi Takemasa
Kenji Tamura
Masayo Tanabu
Makiko Tanaka
Takuya Tasso
Manabu Terata
Keisuke Tsumura
Nobutaka Tsutsui
Akira Uchiyama
Eiichiro Washio
Kozo Watanabe
Shu Watanabe
Masahiko Yamada
Tsuyoshi Yamaguchi
Kazunori Yamanoi
Kenji Yamaoka
Katsuhiko Yokomitsu
Hokuto Yokoyama
Izumi Yoshida
Michiyoshi Yunoki

Japan Communist Party (9 members)

Social Democratic Party (7 members)
Tomoko Abe
Fumihiro Himori
Nobuto Hosaka
Tetsuo Kanno
Yasumasa Shigeno
Kantoku Teruya
Kiyomi Tsujimoto

The People's New Party, New Party Nippon (6 members)
Masaaki Itokawa
Hisaoki Kamei
Shizuka Kamei
Hosei Norota
Makoto Taki
Tamisuke Watanuki

Independents (20 members)

Politics of Japan
Japan politics-related lists
21st-century Japanese politicians